John Schuhmacher (born September 23, 1955) is a former professional American football player in the National Football League (NFL). He played offensive lineman for six seasons for the Houston Oilers.

1955 births
Living people
Sportspeople from Salem, Oregon
Players of American football from Oregon
American football offensive guards
American football offensive tackles
USC Trojans football players
Houston Oilers players